Maia is a Portuguese surname. Notable people with the surname include:

 Beatriz Haddad Maia (born 1996), Brazilian professional tennis player
 César Maia (born 1945), mayor of Rio de Janeiro, Brazil
 Circe Maia (born 1932), Uruguayan poet and translator
 Deidson Araújo Maia, aka Veloso, (born 1983), Brazilian footballer
 Demian Maia (born 1977), Brazilian jiu-jitsu and mixed martial arts fighter
 Gonçalo Mendes da Maia (c.1079–1170), Portuguese knight
 Luizão Maia (1949–2005), Brazilian musician
 Mel Maia (born 2004), Brazilian actress 
 Miguel Maia (born 1971), Portuguese beach volleyball player 
 Salgueiro Maia (1944–1992), Portuguese captain during the Carnation Revolution
 Tim Maia (1942–1998), Brazilian musician

See also
House of Maia
Maia (name)

Portuguese-language surnames
Surnames